The Munich Manual of Demonic Magic or Liber incantationum, exorcismorum et fascinationum variarum (CLM 849 of the Bavarian State Library, Munich) is a fifteenth-century grimoire manuscript. The text, composed in Latin, is largely concerned with demonology and necromancy.

Richard Kieckhefer edited the text of the manuscript in 1998 under the title Forbidden Rites: A Necromancer's Manual of the Fifteenth Century. Portions of the text, in English translation, are presented in Forbidden Rites as well, embedded within the author's essays and explanations on the Munich Manual in specific and grimoires in general. The book has yet to be published in English translation in its entirety. The Russian translation of this Latin grimoire was published in 2019.

Pages 130 to 133 include a list of 11 demons, similar in part to the one from Ars Goetia.

 Count / Duke Barbarus
 Duke Cason
 President / Count Otius
 King Curson
 Duke Alugor
 Prince Taob
 President Volach
 Duke Gaeneron
 Marquis Tuveries
 President Hanni
 Marquis Sucax

References

External links 
Black and white facsimile at the Bavarian State Library

15th-century Latin books
Bavarian State Library
Goetia
Grimoires